The women's kumite +60 kg competition in karate at the 2005 World Games took place on 23 July 2005 at the Kfraftzentrale in Duisburg, Germany.

Competition format
A total of 8 athletes entered the competition. In elimination round they fought in two groups. From this stage the best two athletes qualifies to the semifinals.

Results

Elimination round

Group A

Group B

Finals
{{#invoke:RoundN|N4
|widescore=yes|bold_winner=high|team-width=200
|RD1=Semifinals
|3rdplace=yes

|||0|

References

Karate at the 2005 World Games